Provisional designation in astronomy is the naming convention applied to astronomical objects immediately following their discovery. The provisional designation is usually superseded by a permanent designation once a reliable orbit has been calculated. Approximately 47% of the more than 1,100,000 known minor planets remain provisionally designated, as hundreds of thousands have been discovered in the last two decades.



Minor planets 

The current system of provisional designation of minor planets (asteroids, centaurs and trans-Neptunian objects) has been in place since 1925. It superseded several previous conventions, each of which was in turn rendered obsolete by the increasing numbers of minor planet discoveries. A modern or new-style provisional designation consists of the year of discovery, followed by two letters and, possibly, a suffixed number.

New-style provisional designation 
For example, the provisional designation  stands for the 3910th body identified during 1–15 March 2016:
 2016 – the first element indicates the year of discovery.
 E – the first letter indicates the half-month of the object's discovery within that year and ranges from A (first half of January) to Y (second half of December), while the letters I and Z are not used (see table below). The first half is always the 1st through to the 15th of the month, regardless of the numbers of days in the second "half". Thus, E indicates the period from March 1 to 15.
 K156 – the second letter and a numerical suffix indicate the order of discovery within that half-month. The first 25 discoveries of the half-month only receive a letter (A to Z) without a suffix, while the letter I is not used (to avoid potential confusions with the digit 1). Because modern techniques typically yield hundreds if not thousands of discoveries per half-month, the subscript number is appended to indicate the number of times that the letters from A to Z have cycled through. The suffix 156 indicates 156 completed cycles (156 cycles × 25 letters = 3900), while K is the 10th position in the current cycle. Thus, K156 stands for the 3910th minor planet discovered in a half-month.

This scheme is now also used retrospectively for pre-1925 discoveries. For these, the first digit of the year is replaced by an A. For example, A801 AA indicates the first object discovered in the first half of January 1801 (1 Ceres).

Further explanations 
 During the first half-month of January 2014, the first minor planet identification was assigned the provisional designation .
 An idiosyncrasy of this system is that the second letter is listed before the number, even though the second letter is considered "least-significant". This is in contrast to most of the world's numbering systems. This idiosyncrasy is not seen, however, in the so-called packed form (packed designation).
 A packed designation has no spaces. It may also use letters to codify for the designation's year and subscript number. It is frequently used in online and electronic documents. For example, the provisional designation  is written as K07Tf8A in the packed form, where "K07" stands for the year 2007, and "f8" for the subscript number 418.
 90377 Sedna, a large trans-Neptunian object, had the provisional designation , meaning it was identified in the first half of November 2003 (as indicated by the letter "V"), and that it was the 302nd object identified during that time, as 12 cycles of 25 letters give 300, and the letter "B" is the second position in the current cycle.
 Survey designations do not follow the rules for new-style provisional designations.
 A very busy half month was the second half of January 2015 (letter "B"), which saw a total of 14,208 new minor planet identifications .

Survey designations 

Minor planets discovered during the Palomar–Leiden survey including three subsequent Trojan-campaigns, which altogether discovered more than 4,000 asteroids and Jupiter trojans between 1960 and 1977, have custom designations that consist of a number (order in the survey) followed by a space and one of the following identifiers:
 P-L  Palomar–Leiden survey (1960–1970)
 T-1  Palomar–Leiden Trojan survey (1971)
 T-2  Palomar–Leiden Trojan survey (1973)
 T-3  Palomar–Leiden Trojan survey (1977)

For example, the asteroid 6344 P-L is the 6344th minor planet in the original Palomar–Leiden survey, while the asteroid 4835 T-1 was discovered during the first Trojan-campaign. The majority of these bodies have since been assigned a number and many are already named.

Historical designations 

The first four minor planets were discovered in the early 19th century, after which there was a lengthy gap before the discovery of the fifth. Astronomers initially had no reason to believe that there would be countless thousands of minor planets, and strove to assign a symbol to each new discovery, in the tradition of the symbols used for the major planets. For example, 1 Ceres was assigned a stylized sickle (⚳), 2 Pallas a stylized lance or spear (⚴), 3 Juno a scepter (⚵), and 4 Vesta an altar with a sacred fire. All had various graphic forms, some of considerable complexity.

It soon became apparent, though, that continuing to assign symbols was impractical and provided no assistance when the number of known minor planets was in the dozens. Johann Franz Encke introduced a new system in the Berliner Astronomisches Jahrbuch (BAJ) for 1854, published in 1851, in which he used encircled numbers instead of symbols. Encke's system began the numbering with Astrea which was given the number (1) and went through (11) Eunomia, while Ceres, Pallas, Juno and Vesta continued to be denoted by symbols, but in the following year's BAJ, the numbering was changed so that Astraea was number (5).

The new system found popularity among astronomers, and since then, the final designation of a minor planet is a number indicating its order of discovery followed by a name. Even after the adoption of this system, though, several more minor planets received symbols, including 28 Bellona the morning star and lance of Mars's martial sister, 35 Leukothea an ancient lighthouse and 37 Fides a Latin cross. According to Webster's A Dictionary of the English Language, four more minor planets were also given symbols: 16 Psyche, 17 Thetis, 26 Proserpina, and 29 Amphitrite. However, there is no evidence that these symbols were ever used outside of their initial publication in the Astronomische Nachrichten.

134340 Pluto is an exception: it is a high-numbered minor planet that received a graphical symbol with significant astronomical use (♇), because it was considered a major planet on its discovery, and did not receive a minor planet number until 2006.

Graphical symbols continue to be used for some minor planets, and assigned for some recently discovered larger ones, mostly by astrologers (see astronomical symbol and astrological symbol). Three centaurs – 2060 Chiron, 5145 Pholus, and 7066 Nessus – and the other seven large trans-Neptunian dwarf planets – 50000 Quaoar, 90377 Sedna, 90482 Orcus, 136108 Haumea, 136199 Eris, 136472 Makemake, and 225088 Gonggong – have relatively standard symbols among astrologers: the symbols for Haumea, Makemake, and Eris have even been occasionally used in astronomy. However, such symbols are generally not in use among astronomers.

Genesis of the current system 

Several different notation and symbolic schemes were used during the latter half of the nineteenth century, but the present form first appeared in the journal Astronomische Nachrichten (AN) in 1892. New numbers were assigned by the AN on receipt of a discovery announcement, and a permanent designation was then assigned once an orbit had been calculated for the new object.

At first, the provisional designation consisted of the year of discovery followed by a letter indicating the sequence of the discovery, but omitting the letter I (historically, sometimes J was omitted instead). In 1893, though, increasing numbers of discoveries forced the revision of the system to use double letters instead, in the sequence AA, AB... AZ, BA and so on. The sequence of double letters was not restarted each year, so that  followed  and so on.

Because a considerable amount of time could sometimes elapse between exposing the photographic plates of an astronomical survey and actually spotting a small Solar System object on them (witness the story of Phoebe's discovery), or even between the actual discovery and the delivery of the message (from some far-flung observatory) to the central authority, it became necessary to retrofit discoveries into the sequence — to this day, discoveries are still dated based on when the images were taken, and not on when a human realised they were looking at something new. In the double-letter scheme, this was not generally possible once designations had been assigned in a subsequent year. The scheme used to get round this problem was rather clumsy and used a designation consisting of the year and a lower-case letter in a manner similar to the old provisional-designation scheme for comets. For example,  (note that there is a space between the year and the letter to distinguish this designation from the old-style comet designation 1915a, Mellish's first comet of 1915), 1917 b. In 1914 designations of the form year plus Greek letter were used in addition.

Temporary minor planet designations 

Temporary designations are custom designation given by an observer or discovering observatory prior to the assignment of a provisional designation by the MPC. These intricate designations were used prior to the Digital Age, when communication was slow or even impossible (e.g. during WWI). The listed temporary designations by observatory/observer use uppercase and lowercase letters (LETTER, letter), digits, numbers and years, as well Roman numerals (ROM) and Greek letters (greek).

Comets 

The system used for comets was complex previous to 1995. Originally, the year was followed by a space and then a Roman numeral (indicating the sequence of discovery) in most cases, but difficulties always arose when an object needed to be placed between previous discoveries. For example, after Comet 1881 III and Comet 1881 IV might be reported, an object discovered in between the discovery dates but reported much later couldn't be designated "Comet 1881 III½". More commonly comets were known by the discoverer's name and the year. An alternate scheme also listed comets in order of time of perihelion passage, using lower-case letters; thus "Comet Faye" (modern designation 4P/Faye) was both Comet 1881 I (first comet to pass perihelion in 1881) and Comet 1880c (third comet to be discovered in 1880).

The system since 1995 is similar to the provisional designation of minor planets. For comets, the provisional designation consists of the year of discovery, a space, one letter (unlike the minor planets with two) indicating the half-month of discovery within that year (A=first half of January, B=second half of January, etc. skipping I (to avoid confusion with the number 1 or the numeral I) and not reaching Z), and finally a number (not subscripted as with minor planets), indicating the sequence of discovery within the half-month. Thus, the eighth comet discovered in the second half of March 2006 would be given the provisional designation 2006 F8, whilst the tenth comet of late March would be 2006 F10.

If a comet splits, its segments are given the same provisional designation with a suffixed letter A, B, C, ..., Z, AA, AB, AC...

If an object is originally found asteroidal, and later develops a cometary tail, it retains its asteroidal designation. For example, minor planet 1954 PC turned out to be Comet Faye, and we thus have "4P/1954 PC" as one of the designations of said comet. Similarly, minor planet  was reclassified as a comet, and because it was discovered by LINEAR, it is now known as 176P/LINEAR (LINEAR 52) and (118401) LINEAR.

Provisional designations for comets are given condensed or "packed form" in the same manner as minor planets. 2006 F8, if a periodic comet, would be listed in the IAU Minor Planet Database as PK06F080. The last character is purposely a zero, as that allows comet and minor planet designations not to overlap.

Periodic comets 

Comets are assigned one of four possible prefixes as a rough classification. The prefix "P" (as in, for example, P/1997 C1, a.k.a. Comet Gehrels 4) designates a "periodic comet", one which has an orbital period of less than 200 years or which has been observed during more than a single perihelion passage (e.g. 153P/Ikeya-Zhang, whose period is 367 years). They receive a permanent number prefix after their second observed perihelion passage (see List of periodic comets).

Non-periodic comets 
Comets which do not fulfill the "periodic" requirements receive the "C" prefix (e.g. C/2006 P1, the Great Comet of 2007). Comets initially labeled as "non-periodic" may, however, switch to "P" if they later fulfill the requirements.

Comets which have been lost or have disintegrated are prefixed "D" (e.g. D/1993 F2, Comet Shoemaker-Levy 9).

Finally, comets for which no reliable orbit could be calculated, but are known from historical records, are prefixed "X" as in, for example, X/1106 C1. (Also see List of non-periodic comets and List of hyperbolic comets.)

Satellites and rings of planets 

When satellites or rings are first discovered, they are given provisional designations such as "" (the 11th new satellite of Jupiter discovered in 2000), "" (the first new satellite of Pluto discovered in 2005), or "" (the second new ring of Saturn discovered in 2004). The initial "S/" or "R/" stands for "satellite" or "ring", respectively, distinguishing the designation from the prefixes "C/", "D/", "P/", and "X/" used for comets. These designations are sometimes written as "", dropping the second space.

The prefix "S/" indicates a natural satellite, and is followed by a year (using the year when the discovery image was acquired, not necessarily the date of discovery). A one-letter code written in upper case identifies the planet such as J and S for Jupiter and Saturn, respectively (see list of one-letter abbreviations), and then a number identifies sequentially the observation. For example, Naiad, the innermost moon of Neptune, was at first designated "". Later, once its existence and orbit were confirmed, it received its full designation, "".

The Roman numbering system arose with the very first discovery of natural satellites other than Earth's Moon: Galileo referred to the Galilean moons as I through IV (counting from Jupiter outward), in part to spite his rival Simon Marius, who had proposed the names now adopted. Similar numbering schemes naturally arose with the discovery of moons around Saturn and Uranus. Although the numbers initially designated the moons in orbital sequence, new discoveries soon failed to conform with this scheme (e.g. "" is Amalthea, which orbits closer to Jupiter than does Io). The unstated convention then became, at the close of the 19th century, that the numbers more or less reflected the order of discovery, except for prior historical exceptions (see the Timeline of discovery of Solar System planets and their natural satellites). The convention has been extended to natural satellites of minor planets, such as "".

Moons of minor planets 

The provisional designation system for minor planet satellites, such as asteroid moons, follows that established for the satellites of the major planets. With minor planets, the planet letter code is replaced by the minor planet number in parentheses. Thus, the first observed moon of 87 Sylvia, discovered in 2001, was at first designated S/2001 (87) 1, later receiving its permanent designation of (87) Sylvia I Romulus. Where more than one moon has been discovered, Roman numerals specify the discovery sequence, so that Sylvia's second moon is designated (87) Sylvia II Remus.

Since Pluto was reclassified in 2006, discoveries of Plutonian moons since then follow the minor-planet system: thus Nix and Hydra, discovered in 2005, were S/2005 P 2 and S/2005 P 1, but Kerberos and Styx, discovered in 2011 and 2012 respectively, were S/2011 (134340) 1 and S/2012 (134340) 1. That said, there has been some unofficial use of the formats "S/2011 P 1" and "S/2012 P 1".

Packed designation 

Packed designations are used in online and electronic documents as well as databases.

Packed minor planet designation 

The Orbit Database (MPCORB) of the Minor Planet Center (MPC) uses the "packed form" to refer to all provisionally designated minor planets. The idiosyncrasy found in the new-style provisional designations, no longer exists in this packed-notation system, as the second letter is now listed after the subscript number, or its equivalent 2-digit code. For an introduction on provisional minor planet designations in the "un-packed" form, see .

Provisional packed designations 

The system of packed provisional minor planet designations:
 uses exactly 7 characters with no spaces for all designations
 compacts 4 digit years to a 3-character code, e.g. 2014 is written as K14 (see tables below)
 converts all subscript numbers to a 2-character code (00 is used when there is no following subscript, 99 is used for subscript 99, A0 is used for subscript 100, and A1 is used for 101)
 the packed 2 character subscript code is placed between the half-month letter and the second (discovery order) letter (e.g.  has discovery order K so the last three characters for its packed form are A2K)

Contrary to the new-style system, the letter "i" is used in the packed form both for the year and the numeric suffix. The compacting system provides upper and lowercase letters to encode up to 619 "cycles". This means that 15,500 designations within a half-month can be packed, which is a few times more than the designations assigned monthly in recent years.

 Examples

  is written as J95X00A
  is written as J95X01L
  is written as K16EF6K
  is written as K07Tf8A

 Description
 The year 1995 is compacted to J95. As it has no subscript number, 00 is used as placeholder instead, and directly placed after the half-month letter "X".
 The year 1995 is compacted to J95. Subscript number "1" is padded to 01 to maintain the length of 7 characters, and placed after the first letter.
 The year 2016 is compacted to K16. The subscript number "156" exceeds 2 digits and is converted to F6, (see table below)
 The year 2007 is compacted to K07. The subscript number "418" exceeds 2 digits and is converted to f8, (see table below)

 Conversion tables

Comets follow the minor-planet scheme for their first four characters. The fifth and sixth characters encode the number. The seventh character is usually 0, unless it is a component of a split comet, in which case it encodes in lowercase the letter of the fragment.

 Examples
 1995 A1 is written as J95A010
 1995 P1-B is written as J95P01b (i.e. fragment B of comet )
 2088 A103 is written as K88AA30 (as the subscript number exceeds two digits and is converted according to the above table).

There is also an extended form that adds five characters to the front. The fifth character is one of "C", "D", "P", or "X", according to the status of the comet. If the comet is periodic, then the first four characters are the periodic-comet number (padded to the left with zeroes); otherwise, they are blank.

Natural satellites use the format for comets, except that the last column is always 0.

Packed survey designations 
Survey designations used during the Palomar–Leiden Survey (PLS) have a simpler packed form, as for example: 
  is written as PLS6344
  is written as T1S4835
  is written as T2S1010
  is written as T3S4101

Note that the survey designations are distinguished from provisional designations by having the letter S in the third character, which contains a decimal digit in provisional designations and permanent numbers.

Permanent packed designations 

A packed form for permanent designations also exists (these are numbered minor planets, with or without a name). In this case, only the designation's number is used and converted to a 5-character string. The rest of the permanent designation is ignored. Minor planet numbers below 100,000 are simply zero-padded to 5 digits from the left side. For minor planets above 100,000, a single letter (A–Z and a–z) is used, similar as for the provisional subscript number (also see table above):
 A covers the number range 100,000–109,999
 B covers the number range 110,000–119,999
 a covers the number range 360,000–369,999
 z covers the number range 610,000–619,999

 Examples
 00001 encodes 1 Ceres
 99999 encodes 
 A0000 encodes 100000 Astronautica, 
 A9999 encodes 
 B0000 encodes 
 G3693 encodes 163693 Atira
 Y2843 encodes 342843 Davidbowie
 g0356 encodes 420356 Praamzius

This system permits compression of numbers up to 619,999 (z9999).  the list of minor planets already contains 619,150 objects. For minor planets numbered 620,000 or higher, a tilde "~" will be used as the first character. The subsequent 4 characters encoded in Base62 (using 0–9, then A–Z, and a–z, in this specific order) are used to store the difference of the object's number minus 620,000. This extended system will allow for the encoding of more than 15 million minor planet numbers. For example:
 (620000) will be represented as ~0000 (
 (620061) will be represented as ~000z (
 (3140113) will be represented as ~AZaz (
 (15396335) will be represented as ~zzzz (

For comets, permanent designations only apply to periodic comets that are seen to return. The first four characters are the  number of the comet (left-padded with zeroes). The fifth character is "P", unless the periodic comet is lost or defunct, in which case it is "D".

For natural satellites, permanent packed designations take the form of the planet letter, then three digits containing the converted Roman numeral (left-padded with zeroes), and finally an "S". For example, Jupiter XIII Leda is J013S, and Neptune II Nereid is N002S.

See also 
 Minor-planet designation
 Naming of moons

References

External links 
 New- And Old-Style Minor Planet Designations (Minor Planet Center)

Astronomical nomenclature
Comets
Minor planets
Moons